Robert Gonçalves Santos (born 28 September 1996), commonly known as Robert, is a Brazilian footballer who plays as an attacking midfielder.

Football career
Born in São Gonçalo, Rio de Janeiro, Robert Gonçalves began his career at Fluminense. He was first included in their matchday squad on 3 November 2013, remaining an unused substitute in their Campeonato Brasileiro Série A 1–0 loss at Fla-Flu rivals Clube de Regatas do Flamengo. He was called up for six more games that season, and made his debut in the final fixture on 8 December, replacing Kenedy for the final 24 minutes of a 2–1 win at Esporte Clube Bahia.

After only making three appearances on the bench in the following year's national championship, Robert Gonçalves returned for the 2015 Campeonato Carioca, making five appearances including his first two professional starts. On 8 February, he scored his first goal for the Flu; on as a half-time substitute for Lucas Gomes, he decided a 2–1 win over Bangu Atlético Clube with five minutes remaining at the Maracanã Stadium. He scored in the penalty shootout on 18 April in which his team lost 9–8 to Botafogo de Futebol e Regatas in the semi-finals. Robert went on to make four substitute appearances in the subsequent national league, scoring his first goal in the tournament on 4 October, an added-time consolation in a 3–1 loss at Santos.

On 30 December 2015, Spanish treble champions Barcelona announced the signing of Robert, assigning him to Barcelona B in the Segunda División B for the remainder of the campaign.

On 17 October 2018, Hong Kong club Kitchee confirmed that they would sign Robert following a successful trial in the summer. On 16 January 2019, he was loaned to Hoi King in order to gain more playing time.

On 4 December 2019, Robert Gonçalves returned to Brazilian football, signing a deal with Boavista.

References

External links
 

Living people
1996 births
People from São Gonçalo, Rio de Janeiro
Brazilian footballers
Brazilian expatriate footballers
Association football midfielders
Brazil youth international footballers
Fluminense FC players
Paysandu Sport Club players
FC Barcelona Atlètic players
Boavista Sport Club players
Kitchee SC players
Hoi King SA players
Associação Atlética Portuguesa (RJ) players
Campeonato Brasileiro Série A players
Hong Kong Premier League players
Brazilian expatriate sportspeople in Spain
Brazilian expatriate sportspeople in Hong Kong
Expatriate footballers in Spain
Expatriate footballers in Hong Kong
Sportspeople from Rio de Janeiro (state)